is a Japanese former swimmer. He competed in the men's 4 × 100 metre medley relay at the 1964 Summer Olympics.

References

External links
 

1941 births
Living people
Japanese male butterfly swimmers
Olympic swimmers of Japan
Swimmers at the 1964 Summer Olympics
Universiade medalists in swimming
Place of birth missing (living people)
Asian Games medalists in swimming
Asian Games gold medalists for Japan
Swimmers at the 1966 Asian Games
Medalists at the 1966 Asian Games
Universiade bronze medalists for Japan
Medalists at the 1963 Summer Universiade
20th-century Japanese people